The Belgium cricket team toured Malta in July 2021 to play five Twenty20 International (T20I) matches at the Marsa Sports Club in Marsa. The Maltese team had been due to play a four-match series in Belgium in 2021, but this was cancelled due to the COVID-19 pandemic. As preparation for the series, the Belgium team were scheduled to play four T20 exhibition games against the Netherlands A cricket team in June 2021, but these matches were later cancelled. Malta were declared winners of the fourth T20I after five penalty runs were retrospectively added to their total. Belgium won the series 3–2.

Squads

T20I series

1st T20I

2nd T20I

3rd T20I

4th T20I

5th T20I

Notes

References

External links
 Series home at ESPN Cricinfo

Associate international cricket competitions in 2021